The 1991–92 season was the 90th season in which Dundee competed at a Scottish national level, playing in the Scottish First Division for the second consecutive season. Dundee would finish at the top of the table as champions, and would be promoted back to the Premier Division. Dundee would also compete in both the Scottish League Cup and the Scottish Cup, where they were knocked out by Ayr United in the 2nd round of the League Cup, and by Falkirk in a 4th round replay of the Scottish Cup. Dundee would also compete in the Scottish Challenge Cup, and would be knocked out by Ayr United in the 1st round.

Scottish First Division 

Statistics provided by Dee Archive.

League table

Scottish League Cup 

Statistics provided by Dee Archive.

Scottish Cup 

Statistics provided by Dee Archive.

Scottish Challenge Cup 
Statistics provided by Dee Archive.

Player statistics 
Statistics provided by Dee Archive

|}

See also 

 List of Dundee F.C. seasons

References

External links 

 1991–92 Dundee season on Fitbastats

Dundee F.C. seasons
Dundee